Aviva Armour-Ostroff is a Canadian actress, writer and filmmaker. She is most noted as the star, co-writer and co-director of the 2021 film Lune, for which she received a Canadian Screen Award nomination for Best Actress at the 10th Canadian Screen Awards in 2022.

She was formerly the producer of Toronto's Lab Cab theatre festival.<ref name=grief>Amy Grief, "Toronto actor and playwright explores themes of identity". Canadian Jewish News, October 30, 2015.</ref> She is a two-time Dora Mavor Moore Award nominee for her stage performances, receiving a solo nomination for ARC Stage's production of Deirdre Kinahan's play Moment in 2015, and an ensemble nomination alongside Deborah Drakeford, Carlos González-Vío, Ryan Hollyman, Andre Sills and Arlen Aguayo-Stewart, for ARC's production of Stef Smith's play Human Animals in 2019.

She is married to Arturo Pérez Torres, with whom she codirected both The Drawer Boy and Lune''.

References

External links

21st-century Canadian actresses
21st-century Canadian screenwriters
Canadian women film directors
Canadian women screenwriters
Canadian film actresses
Canadian television actresses
Canadian stage actresses
Canadian theatre directors
Actresses from Toronto
Film directors from Toronto
Writers from Toronto
Jewish Canadian actresses
Jewish Canadian filmmakers
Jewish Canadian writers
Living people
Year of birth missing (living people)